Dendeviin Amgaa (born 25 July 1952) is a Mongolian judoka. He competed in the men's half-heavyweight event at the 1980 Summer Olympics.

References

1952 births
Living people
Mongolian male judoka
Olympic judoka of Mongolia
Judoka at the 1980 Summer Olympics
People from Bulgan Province
20th-century Mongolian people